Municipal elections were held in San Diego in 2016 for mayor, city attorney, city council, and ballot measures. The primary election was held on Tuesday, June 7, 2016, and the general election was held on Tuesday, November 8, 2016. Five of the nine council seats were contested. Two city council incumbents ran for reelection.

Municipal elections in California are officially non-partisan, although most members do identify a party preference. A two-round system was used for the election, starting with a primary in June followed by a runoff in November between the top-two candidates if no candidate received a majority of the votes in the first round.

Mayor 

Incumbent Kevin Faulconer ran for a second term as Mayor against former San Diego City Councilmember Ed Harris and former California State Assemblymember Lori Saldaña. He won election in the primary with over 50% of the vote.

City Attorney

City Council

Seats in districts 1, 3, 5, 7, and 9 were up for election. Sherri Lightner (District 1) and Todd Gloria (District 3) were ineligible to run for re-election due to term limits. Incumbent Marti Emerald (District 9) chose not to seek reelection.

Republicans hoped to overturn the Democratic Party's 5–4 majority by flipping District 1 from Democratic to Republican.

District 1 
District 1 consists of the communities of Carmel Valley, Del Mar Mesa, Del Mar Heights, La Jolla, Pacific Highlands Ranch, Torrey Hills, Torrey Pines, and University City. Incumbent Sherri Lightner was ineligible to run due to term limits. Republican Ray Ellis and Democrats Barbara Bry and Joe LaCava were expected to run to replace Lightner. In January 2016, LaCava announced that he had decided not to run. Morning of March 3, 2016 Louis Rodolico entered the race followed that same afternoon by Bruce Lightner, husband to the incumbent Sherri Lightner, and Kyle Heiskala, two days layer a policy advisor on Sherri Lightner's City Council staff, pulled papers to run for the District 1 seat.

Since no candidate received a majority of the votes in the June primary, Bry and Ellis were slated to advance to the November runoff election. However, on August 12, 2016 Ellis announced that he would be withdrawing from the election. Despite effectively conceding the race, Ellis's name still appeared on November ballot. Bry was then elected to the City Council in November.

District 3 
District 3 consists of the communities of Balboa Park, Bankers Hill/Park West, Downtown San Diego, Golden Hill, Hillcrest, Little Italy, Mission Hills, Normal Heights, North Park, Old Town, South Park, and University Heights. Incumbent Todd Gloria was ineligible to run due to term limits. Chris Ward was elected in the June primary with a majority of the vote.

District 5 
District 5 consists of the neighborhoods of Black Mountain Ranch, Carmel Mountain Ranch, Miramar, Rancho Bernardo, Rancho Encantada, Rancho Peñasquitos, Sabre Springs, San Pasqual Valley, Scripps Ranch, and Torrey Highlands. Incumbent Mark Kersey was initially expected to run unopposed, but ultimately faced two opponents to his reelection. Kersey was reelected in the June primary with a majority of the vote.

District 7 
District 7 consists of the neighborhoods of Allied Gardens, Del Cerro, Grantville, Linda Vista, Mission Valley, San Carlos, Serra Mesa, and Tierrasanta. Incumbent Scott Sherman filed to run for reelection. Sherman was reelected in the June primary with a majority of the vote.

District 9 
District 9 consists of the communities of Alvarado Estates, City Heights, College Area, College View Estates, El Cerrito, Kensington, Mountain View, Mount Hope, Rolando, Southcrest, and Talmadge. Incumbent Marti Emerald chose not to seek reelection. Since no candidate received a majority of the votes in the June primary, a runoff election was held in November 2016 between Ricardo Flores and Georgette Gomez. Gomez was then elected to the City Council in November.

Council President
On December 12, 2016, the new council was sworn in. For their first action, the council voted 6–3 to appoint Myrtle Cole as council president. David Alvarez, who was considered the other main candidate for the position, was joined in opposition to Cole's appointment by newly sworn in council members Ward and Gomez. Although both Alvarez and Cole were Democrats, Cole was seen as more moderate or centrist than Alvarez.

Boards of Education 
Three of the five seats on the independent San Diego Unified School District Board of Education were up for the general election. Richard Barrera ran unopposed. All three incumbents won reelection. Only one seat was up on the San Diego Community College District Board of Trustees. Incumbent Mary Graham won reelection.

June measures

Measure A 
Ballot Title: Charter Amendments Regarding Redistricting of Council Districts in the City of San Diego

Ballot Language: "Shall the City Charter be amended to update the process related to redistricting of City Council districts, including amendments to expand the citizen Redistricting Commission from seven to nine members, to clarify and expand the timeline for the appointment and qualification of members, to provide for alternate members on the Commission and appointing panel, and to explain the effective date of boundaries."

Measure B 
Ballot Title: Charter Amendments Regarding the Authorization and Issuance of General Obligation Bonds and Revenue Bonds

Ballot Language: "Shall the City Charter be amended to update provisions related to the authorization and issuance of bonds, to reflect changes in state law, and simplify and conform the City's processes with the California Constitution?"

Measure C 
Ballot Title: Charter Amendments Regarding the Levy, Assessment and Collection of Property Taxes and the Repeal of Provisions for Collecting Property Taxes the City Cannot Collect Under State Law.

Ballot Language: "Shall the City Charter be amended to clarify the manner in which the City levies, assesses and collects property taxes in the City, and to repeal provisions regarding property taxes the City is not able to levy as a result of Proposition 13 and related state law?"

Measure D 
Ballot Title: Charter Amendment Regarding Power to Fix Salaries

Ballot Language: "Shall City Charter section 70 be amended to conform to existing provisions related to the Strong Mayor form of government, by updating titles of specified officers and clarifying who has authority to fix their salaries and the City's compensation schedules; to specify the City's legal duty to comply with California's collective bargaining laws in establishing annual compensation schedules; and to update language?"

Measure E 
Ballot Title: Charter Amendments Regarding the Budget and Appropriations Process for the City of San Diego

Ballot Language: "Shall the City Charter be amended to update the process related to budgeting and appropriating funds, to consolidate provisions that appeared throughout the Charter and to clarify the approval process for the City budget?"

Measure F 
Ballot Title: Charter Amendments Regarding Financial Operations of the City of San Diego

Ballot Language: "Shall the City Charter be amended to update the City's financial operations, including amendments regarding the certification of funds, the authorization and payment of claims, the management of funds, the disposition of proceeds of the sale of City-owned real property and the establishment of reserves?"

Measure G 
Ballot Title: Charter Amendment Regarding Audits of Accounts of City Officials and Officers Upon Their Death, Resignation, or Removal from City Office

Ballot Language: "Shall the City Charter be amended to update language and to repeal the requirement that the City Auditor conduct audits and investigations of City officials and officers upon their death, resignation, or removal from City office?"

Measure H 
Ballot Title: Charter Amendment: Infrastructure Fund

Ballot Language: "Shall the Charter be amended to require certain unrestricted General Fund revenues to be deposited in an Infrastructure Fund used exclusively to pay for capital improvements including streets, sidewalks, bridges, bike paths, storm water and drainage systems; public buildings including libraries, recreational and community centers; public safety facilities including police, fire and lifeguard stations; and park facilities, but expressly not used for new convention center facilities and new professional sports venues?"

Measure I 
Ballot Title: Referendum of Ordinance Regarding Earned Sick Leave and Minimum Wage

Ballot Language: "Shall Ordinance O-20390 be approved, establishing that employers are to compensate employees working in the City of San Diego with earned sick leave of up to forty hours a year and a minimum wage of $10.50 an hour upon the Ordinance's effective date, $11.50 an hour on January 1, 2017, and increasing with the cost of living on January 1, 2019 and annually thereafter?"

November measures

Measure A 
Ballot Title: San Diego County Road Repair, Transit, Traffic Relief, Safety and Water Quality Measure

Ballot Language: "Shall an ordinance be adopted to: repair roads, deteriorating bridges; relieve congestion; provide every community funds for pothole/street repairs; expand public transit, including improved services for seniors, disabled, students, veterans; reduce polluted runoff; preserve open space to protect water quality/reduce wildfires by enacting, with independent oversight/audits, a 40-year, half-cent local sales tax ($308 million annually) that Sacramento cannot take away?"

Measure B 
Ballot Title: Ordinance Amending the County General Plan, County Zoning Map and County Code, and Adopting the Lilac Hills Ranch Specific Plan

Ballot Language: "Shall this Initiative be adopted for the purpose of amending the County General Plan, Zoning Ordinance and Code of Regulatory Ordinances and approving the Lilac Hills Ranch Specific Plan ("Plan")? The Plan provides for the development of a 608-acre master-planned community including 1,746 dwelling units, three commercial centers, a public park, 10 private parks and 16 miles of trails. The project site is generally located north of Escondido and east of I-15 in the unincorporated area of North San Diego County."

Measure C 
Ballot Title: Downtown Stadium Initiative

Ballot Language: "Should the measure be adopted to: increase San Diego's hotel occupancy tax by 6% to build a City-owned downtown professional football stadium and convention center project, and fund tourism marketing; effect the project financing, design, construction, use, management, and maintenance, including a $650,000,000 contribution and 30-year commitment by a professional football entity; end Tourism Marketing District assessments; adopt a development ordinance, and related land use, sign, and zoning laws?"

Measure D 
Ballot Title: Facilities and Tourism Tax Initiative

Ballot Language: "Should the measure be adopted to: among other provisions, increase San Diego's hotel occupancy tax up to 5%; end Tourism Marketing District; allow hoteliers to create assessment districts and use hotel occupancy taxes for downtown convention center and not a stadium; prohibit contiguous expansion of existing convention center; create downtown overlay zone for convention and sports facilities; create environmental processes; and allow Qualcomm stadium property's sale for educational and park uses?"

Measure E 
Ballot Title: Charter Amendment Regarding Qualifications, Vacancy, and Removal from Office for Mayor, City Attorney, and City Council

Ballot Language: "Shall the Charter be amended to include a new article adding: incapacity, felony conviction, and removal as grounds for vacancies in office; a procedure for calling a special election to remove an officer for cause; a revised procedure for filling vacancies; to require the City Attorney be a licensed attorney; and to define authority during vacancies and enforcement of office forfeiture?"

Measure F 
Ballot Title: Charter Amendment Regarding Required Term of Service for Certain Terminations or Suspensions of Deputy City Attorneys

Ballot Language: "Shall the City Charter be amended to change the term of service required of Deputy City Attorneys, for protection from termination or suspension without good cause, from two years or more of continuous service to one year or more of continuous service, which protection would continue not to apply to layoffs due to lack of work or insufficient appropriations?"

Measure G 
Ballot Title: Charter Amendments Regarding The Citizens' Review Board on Police Practices

Ballot Language: "Shall section 43(d) of the City Charter be amended to rename the Citizens' Review Board on Police Practices as the Community Review Board on Police Practices, to replace references to "City Manager" with "Mayor and City Council," and to require the board to review all deaths occurring while someone is in the custody of the San Diego Police Department and all police officer-related shootings?"

Measure H 
Ballot Title: Charter Amendments Regarding Purchasing and Contracting Processes for the City of San Diego

Ballot Language: "Shall the City Charter be amended to: require contracts for public works, goods, services, and consultants to be awarded through a competitive process in accordance with rules adopted by ordinance, remove the position of Purchasing Agent, eliminate the requirement to publish certain notices in printed newspapers, and update other provisions consistent with state law?"

Measure I 
Ballot Title: Charter Amendment Regarding Balboa Park and San Diego High School

Ballot Language: "Shall City Charter section 55 be amended to authorize the City Council to lease the dedicated park property in Balboa Park currently occupied by San Diego High School, to the San Diego Unified School District for educational, cultural, recreational, and civic programs and activities, provided that the property is used for a public high school?"

Measure J 
Ballot Title: Charter Amendment Regarding Use of Lease Revenue from Mission Bay Park

Ballot Language: "Shall Charter section 55.2 be amended to: increase, from 25% to 35%, the allocation of annual Mission Bay Park lease revenues exceeding $20 million, for capital improvements in San Diego Regional Parks; allow Council to add City-owned parkland to Mission Bay Park's boundaries; combine and coordinate construction of Mission Bay Park improvements identified in this section; and extend operation of this section until 2069?"

Measure K 
Ballot Title: Charter Amendment Requiring Run-Off Election for the Offices of Mayor, City Attorney, and Councilmember

Ballot Language: "Shall the Charter be amended to eliminate the provision that elects a candidate for Mayor, City Attorney, or Councilmember to office if the candidate receives a majority vote in the June primary election, and instead require a run-off election at the November general election between the two candidates who received the most votes in the primary election?"

Measure L 
Ballot Title: Charter Amendment Regarding the Timing of Elections for Citizens' Initiative Measures and Referendum Measures

Ballot Language: "Shall the Charter be amended to require qualified citizens' initiative and referendum measures to be submitted to voters on the next November general election ballot and not at a June primary election, unless the Council chooses to submit the measure to voters prior to that election?"

Measure M 
Ballot Title: Affordable Housing: Increasing the Limit on the Number of Units the City and Certain Public Agencies are Allowed to Help Develop

Ballot Language: "Shall the voters increase by 38,680 the maximum number of housing units the City and certain other public agencies are allowed to help develop, construct, or acquire for people with low incomes, without this ballot measure approving specific housing units, providing funds for development, removing requirements that otherwise apply, or taking any other action?"

Measure N 
Ballot Title: Non-Medical Cannabis Business Tax

Ballot Language: "If California voters approve Proposition 64 legalizing marijuana in the state, shall the City adopt an ordinance imposing a gross receipts tax, for general revenue purposes, on non-medical cannabis (also known as marijuana) businesses operating in the City, initially set at 5% and increasing to 8% on July 1, 2019, having a maximum rate of 15%, generating an undetermined amount of revenue and continuing indefinitely?"

References

External links 

 San Diego Office of the City Clerk
 Voter Pamphlets and Election Results by Election Date (from 1970 forward)
 Propositions: Ballot Questions and Results by Decade (from 1900 forward)

San Diego
San Diego
2016
2010s in San Diego